Wrabness Nature Reserve is a 27 hectare Local Nature Reserve on the south bank of the River Stour, west of Wrabness in Essex. It is managed by the Essex Wildlife Trust.

This site has grassland, marsh, scrub and woodland. It has a diverse bird life, such as yellowhammers, whitethroats, song thrushes and short-eared owls. There are also winter visitors including black-tailed godwits, grey plovers and turnstones. Plants include corn mints and hairy buttercups, and there is a wide variety of invertebrates. The grassland is grazed to prevent the vegetation from becoming too coarse.

There is access from Whitesheaf Lane.

References

Local Nature Reserves in Essex
Essex Wildlife Trust